Abla Mehio Sibai (Arabic: عبلة محيو السباعي) is a Professor of Epidemiology at the American University of Beirut (AUB), Lebanon. Sibai has served as the Interim Dean of AUB's Faculty of Health Sciences (FHS) from 2020-22 and is currently serving as the Dean of FHS. She is also the co-founder and director of the Center for Studies on Aging in Lebanon.

Early life and education 
Despite being inspired by mathematics, Abla Mehio Sibai studied pharmacy at the American University of Beirut, where she earned her bachelor's degree in 1977. Her brief pharmacy career came to a halt because of the violent situation in Lebanon. After being a full-time mother for 10 years, she returned to the American University of Beirut where she got her master's degree in epidemiology in 1986. Sibai received her PhD in epidemiology from London School of Hygiene and Tropical Medicine in 1997.

Research and career 
Being a public health scholar, Sibai's research focuses on healthy ageing, social demography, and epidemiology of non-communicable diseases (NCDs). In Lebanon, she co-founded the AUB University for Seniors (UFS) program in 2010, and is also the Director of the Center for Studies on Ageing which she co-founded in 2008.

Other activities 
 World Health Organization (WHO), Member of the Science Council (since 2021)
 HelpAge International, Member of the Board of Trustees

Recognition
Sibai was awarded the L'Oréal-UNESCO For Women in Science Award in 2020 "for her pioneering research and advocacy to improve healthy ageing in low- and middle-income countries and their impact on health and social policies and programs." Sibai was also awarded the Dr A.T. Shousha Foundation Prize in 2014 for her contributions to public health, and The State of Kuwait Prize for the Control of Cancer, Cardiovascular Diseases and Diabetes in the Eastern Mediterranean Region in 2019.

References

Living people
Year of birth missing (living people)
L'Oréal-UNESCO Awards for Women in Science laureates
Academic staff of the American University of Beirut
Dr A.T. Shousha Foundation Prize and Fellowship laureates
WHO laureates